is a train station in Shinagawa, Tokyo, Japan. The station was established in 1904.

Lines
Keikyu
Main Line

Layout
This elevated station consists of two side platforms serving two tracks.

History 
Keikyu introduced station numbering to its stations on 21 October 2010; Tachiaigawa was assigned station number KK06.

References

Railway stations in Japan opened in 1904
Railway stations in Tokyo